Rajiv Lakshman Ambadapudi (born 15 April 1975) is a creator and former presenter of the television series,  MTV Dropout Pvt Ltd and MTV Roadies. He is the twin brother of Raghu Ram, who was also involved in the show. Rajiv has also worked in other productions as an actor. They both studied at the Woodstock School in Landour, Uttarakhand. They later attended the University of Delhi in Delhi. In the first year, both were students of Deshbandhu College, but in the second year, they joined Sri Venkateswara College.

Career
Rajiv and Raghu have been involved in the show MTV Roadies since 2001. The Indian Express described them as "television's famous angry twins" as they have a reputation for being outspoken. The twin brothers studied at the Woodstock School in Landour, Uttarakhand. In February 2012, CNBC-TV18 wrote that the twins "play the evil bullies to perfection".

Rajiv is also involved in production work of the Stunt reality program Jaanbaaz. He starred in 2010 alongside brother Raghu in the film Tees Maar Khan.

Rajiv has appeared in Comedy Nights Bachao.

In 2016, Rajiv appeared in a movie called "Dhanak", which garnered acclaim.

Pairing with his brother Raghu again, Rajiv is seen in MTV Dropout Pvt Ltd, a reality television show for budding entrepreneurs.

In 2019, he and his brother Raghu, starred in Amazon Prime's Skulls and Roses. The show received negative reviews and therefore it was not continued for a second season.

In 2021, he starred in the Tamil film Doctor as Alvin, with his twin Raghu playing Melvin.

References

1973 births
Identical twins
Living people
MTV people
Delhi University alumni
People from Krishna district
Indian game show hosts
Indian twins